Motion graphic design, also known as motion design, is a subset of graphic design in that it uses graphic design principles in a filmmaking or video production context (or other temporally evolving visual media) through the use of animation or filmic techniques. Examples include the kinetic typography and graphics used in film and television opening sequences, and station identification logos of some television channels. 

A motion graphic designer may be a person trained in traditional graphic design who has learned to integrate temporally evolving visual media into their existing design knowledge, though motion designers may also come from a filmmaking or animation background, as these fields share a number of overlapping skills.

Technology
Technological advancements during the 20th and 21st centuries have greatly impacted the field; chief among these are improvements in modern computing technology, as computer programs for the film and video industries became more powerful and more widely available during this period. Modern motion graphic design typically involves any of several computerized tools and processes.

One of the leading computer programs used by modern motion graphic designers has been Adobe After Effects, which allows the user to create and modify graphics over time. Another relatively recent product used in the market is Apple Inc. Motion, now a part of Final Cut Studio. Software such as Maxon Cinema4D has integrated tools to create motion graphics, such as the native MoGraph plugin, or ICE of Softimage, which can also be used for similar purposes.

Adobe Flash has also been widely used to create motion graphic design, particularly for the web, where it is sometimes used in web design, but also in some animation products, such as animated web television productions like Homestar Runner.

Adobe Premiere Pro has also been a very beneficial tool for motion designers. Using After Effects and Premiere pro can add a lot to any motion designer and video creation. The different effects that both software has been helpful to use in any video. Motion designers and video editors often use a variety of softwares together to create professional videos.

Media Encoder is a software used to render any video. Since motion designers work with lots of video editing and animations, they require software that would help them render their work in the highest quality possible.

Types of Motion Graphics 
Motion graphic design is often used in the film industry. Openings to movies, television shows, and news programs often use photography, typography, and motion graphics to create visually appealing imagery. Motion graphic design has also achieved widespread use in content marketing and advertising. The global technology firm Cisco projects that 82 percent of all web traffic will be video by 2022. Because of this, marketers and advertisers have focused much of their efforts on the production of high-quality branded video and motion graphic content.

In addition to its myriad of uses in advertising, marketing, and branding, motion graphics are used in software, ui design, video game development, and other fields. Although motion design and animation share many commonalities, the difference between them lies in the fact that animation as a specific art form focuses more on cinematic effects and storytelling techniques to craft a narrative, whereas motion design is typically associated with setting abstract objects, text and other graphic design elements in motion. Bringing a graph, infographic or web design to life using movement is broadly speaking “animation,” but more specifically, it’s a type of animation that’s called motion graphics.

Motion graphics take a variety of forms. While some are entirely animated, others incorporate live-action video and/or photography. The latter may include animation overlay, such as data visualizations, icons, illustrations, and explanatory text used to complement and enhance audiences' understanding of the content.

In content marketing contexts, there are three primary types of motion graphics which marketers choose to use depending on the goals they wish to achieve with the motion graphic. Explainer motion graphics seek to elucidate a product, process, or concept. Emotive motion graphics, meanwhile, aim to inspire a particular emotional response in audiences. And finally, promotional motion graphics are used to raise awareness about a service, product, or initiative. Because so many motion graphics are designed with particular goals in mind, it is often essential to partner with a designer or organization specializing in visual communication design to achieve a final product that conveys information in both an accurate and compelling way.

Motion graphics trends:

 Minimalist color scheme — A minimalist color scheme gives the viewers a feeling of serenity, calmness, and purity. In the past three decades, almost every major company changed its logo from vibrant to minimalist. Now the same philosophy has been brought to video making.
 Mixing 2D and 3D — Mixing 2D and 3D means combining different aspects of both animations in a single video. Usually, it’s 3D characters or alphabets existing and moving in a two-dimensional space.
 Kinetic typography — an animation technique in which the artists use moving text to catch and retain attention.
 Anti-gravity and floating — This effect involves using 3D objects floating in a three-dimensional space without a definite pattern, giving the impression as if they’re in a zero-gravity space.
 Inclusive visuals — When you upload a video to the internet, you talk to a global audience of all cultures, races, social and economic backgrounds, and geographical locations. To appeal to such a diverse audience, ensuring they feel connected to your video is essential.
 Vibrant nostalgia — The minimalist revolution in the graphics world has been so drastic that most audiences often feel nostalgic about how things used to be. To tackle this, animators introduced “vibrant nostalgia.” It’s a design in motion graphics that incorporates old-school components like newspaper and magazine designs in modern animation, giving it a refreshing yet nostalgic vibe.
 Seamless transitions — Though it might not seem like a huge deal, the little things make a great animation. Seamless transitioning is just one of those small things. Its use has seen a tremendous surge in motion graphics in the past few years and will continue to be a part of it in the upcoming years.
 Hyper-realistic 3D motion graphics — The more CGI is advancing, hyper-realistic 3D is also getting increasingly popular. Apart from the fact that it will blow the viewers’ minds with the visuals, it is also very helpful in creating detailed architectural imagery of a structure.
 Stop motion — Traditionally, stop motion is produced by taking continuous photos of real objects in a studio.

UX and motion design

UX, also known as user experience, works hand in hand with motion design. For example, when designing a phone app, motion design is used to improve user experience. Motion design improves the user experience tremendously and effectively by adding animations to any screen. Motion design is not only used in phone apps; it is used in computers, tablets, smartphones, televisions, and lots more. UX designers use motion design to create their prototyping, and experience with it to determine whether it is easy to use for an average person, or if it needs enhancing.

Jobs and Salaries
There are many career opportunities as a motion designer. Career paths can include cartoon animating, advertising, video advertising, logo animator, video editing, UI motion, and many more.

Cartoon Animating: As a cartoon animator, motion designers help make the 2D drawings come to life, and start moving. Every cartoon produced on TV channels is made by a motion designer, or a motion designing team. As a cartoon designer, salaries varies between $75,000 to $115,000 annually. 

Advertising: As an advertising motion designer, the movements of objects and color are used to attract the audience. All the affects and dramatic movements are made by a motion designer, or motion designing team. Advertising motion designers' salaries can vary between $60,000 to $90,000 annually.

Logo Animation: Logo animation can simply be a small dynamic affect, or could be a promotion video based on the logo. Logo animation is used with restaurant logos, automobile logos, and more in advertising. Salaries for logo animators range between $40,000 to $70,000 annually. 

Video Editing: Video editing is often used for YouTube videos, especially animation videos. For example, there are many YouTubers that create minutes long of animations, and do a simple voiceover on them. Video editing also involves adding dramatic dynamics to a video to simply attract viewers and make any video more interesting. Video editors' salaries can range between $48,000 to $78,000 annually.

Motion designer skills
The use of typography is critical to motion designers. Often, there is text needed in any video, cartoon, or advertisement produced. A good motion designer will know the correct type style, size, and time to use the text to attract the audience. 

Knowledge of color theory is another very important skill set for motion designers. Motion designers need to have a good understanding of the color circle, complementary colors, and color saturations. The use of color is extremely helpful to communicate a certain mood, affect, or emotion to the audience.

Motion designers must also have software experience. Some of the software includes Adobe Photoshop, Adobe Illustrator, Adobe After Effects, Adobe Premiere Pro, and more. These softwares help motion designers build their projects efficiently.

There are a number of general skills that come with experience. Being detail oriented is very important in the community of motion design. Motion designers must have a sense of timing, meaning they have to be able to time things like the intersection between audio and video.

History
Motion design started back in the early 1800s when early animation devices were invented. There were no official founding fathers, however, Saul Bass, Pablo Ferro, and John Whitney were some of the first to experiment with motion design. Presentation flip-books are considered the first work of motion design, when John Whitney co-founded them back in the early 1800s. 

John Whitney was one of the main founding fathers of computer motion designing. In 1960, he was the first to illustrate motion design on computers to create motion pictures and television titles. Later on, Saul Bass introduced the first moving object from small to large, and was the first swirling graphic introduced on television.

Professional Education
A degree in motion design helps communicate aspects like concepts, theory, and messages to viewers along with a set of strong skills that help create a strong start in a professional career. Typically, motion design students spend 36 months in school to receive a bachelor's degree in motion graphics. Education helps start beginners skill level that will later on play a huge role in growing into higher skill sets much easier than someone without an education.

See also
 Animation
 Film title design
 Motion graphics
 Web design
 Web television
 User experience
 Graphic design
 Video editing
 Adobe software

References
 Willenskomer, Issara. “Motion Design in Digital Products: a White Paper.” Medium, UX in Motion, 20 June 2019

 Richard Williams, The Animator's Survival Kit, a manual of methods, principles and formulas.

 “The History of Motion Graphics - Triplet 3D: Blog.” Triplet 3D, 3 July 2015, www.triplet3d.com/the-history-of-motion-graphics.

 Norman, Donald A. The Design of Everyday Things. Basic Books, 2013.

Blauvelt, Andrew, et al. Graphic Design : Now in Production. 1st ed., Walker Art Center, 2011.

Krasner, Jon S. Motion Graphic Design : Applied History and Aesthetics. 2nd ed., Focal Press, 2008, https://doi.org/10.4324/9780080887326.

External links
 KRASNER, JON. “Chapter 3.” MOTION GRAPHIC DESIGN: Applied History and Aesthetics, CRC PRESS, 2017.

Communication design
Graphic design
Graphics
Design
Multimedia